Rokusonnō Shrine (六孫王神社) is a Shinto shrine located in Minami-ku, Kyoto, Kyoto Prefecture, Japan. It is one of the Three Genji Shrines, a group of three Japanese Shinto shrines connected with the Seiwa Genji group (the descent from Emperor Seiwa) of the Minamoto clan.

See also
Three Genji Shrines

External links
 Official site of Rokusonnō Shrine

Minamoto clan
Shinto shrines in Kyoto